"Above the Rim" is a song co-written and performed by American contemporary R&B group Bell Biv DeVoe, issued as the official lead single from the group's second studio album Hootie Mack (following promotional single "From the Back"). The song contains a sample of "South Bronx" by Boogie Down Productions and "Blind Alley" by The Emotions. and it peaked at #81 on the Billboard R&B chart in 1993.

Chart positions

References

External links
 
 

1993 songs
1993 singles
Bell Biv DeVoe songs
MCA Records singles
Songs written by Ricky Bell (singer)
Songs written by Michael Bivins
Songs written by Ronnie DeVoe